Linda Cardellini is an American actress. She is known for her leading roles in television, such as the teen drama Freaks and Geeks (1999–2000), the medical drama ER (2003–09), the drama thriller Bloodline (2015–17), and the black tragicomedy Dead to Me (2019–present), the latter of which earned her a nomination for the Primetime Emmy Award for Outstanding Lead Actress in a Comedy Series. She also guest starred in the period drama Mad Men (2013–15), for which she gained a Primetime Emmy Award nomination. Cardellini provided her voice for the animated series Scooby-Doo! Mystery Incorporated (2010–13), Regular Show (2012–15), Gravity Falls (2012–16), and Sanjay and Craig (2013–16).

Cardellini portrayed Velma Dinkley in the live action films Scooby-Doo (2002) and its sequel Scooby-Doo 2: Monsters Unleashed (2004), and has appeared as Laura Barton / Agent 19 in the Marvel Cinematic Universe superhero films Avengers: Age of Ultron (2015) and Avengers: Endgame (2019), and the Disney+ series Hawkeye (2021). Other film appearances include Legally Blonde (2001), Brokeback Mountain (2005), Daddy's Home (2015), Daddy's Home 2 (2017), Green Book (2018), and The Curse of La Llorona (2019). Cardellini's work in the drama film Return (2011) earned her an Independent Spirit Award for Best Female Lead nomination.

Film

Television

Video games

Music videos

References

External links
Linda Cardellini at the Internet Movie Database

Actress filmographies
American filmographies